WARE (1250 AM) is a commercial radio station broadcasting a classic hits format. Licensed to Ware, Massachusetts, United States, the station serves the Springfield radio market.  The station is currently owned by Success Signal Broadcasting. WARE also operates an FM translator in Springfield, W249DP (97.7 MHz).  The translator has its tower near Palmer, Massachusetts, and is powered at 250 watts.

The station calls itself "The Valley's Classic Hits" referring to the Pioneer Valley of the Connecticut River.

Translator

History
WARE first signed on the air in 1948, originally as WRMS.  It was owned by Donald W. Howe and was a daytimer.  It transmitted with 1,000 watts and had to go off the air at sunset to avoid interfering with other stations on AM 1250.  A year later, in 1949, it switched its call letters to WARE.

Unusual call letters
WARE is one of three stations in the United States where the call sign spells out the name of the city of license. The other stations are WACO-FM in Waco, Texas, and WISE-FM in Wise, Virginia (a satellite of WVTF).

References

External links

ARE
Classic hits radio stations in the United States
Mass media in Hampshire County, Massachusetts
Radio stations established in 1948
1948 establishments in Massachusetts